The 2014–15 European Championship B tournament was the eighth staging of the Rugby League European Shield tournament played in the respective European countries participating over 2014 and 2015.

Germany were replaced in the tournament by Ukraine. Ukraine was joined by Russia, Serbia and Italy to contest the tournament. The tournament formed part of the 2017 Rugby League World Cup qualifying process, as the top three teams from the European B competition advanced to the final round-robin stage.

Standings
Serbia, Russia and Italy have all qualified for the next stage of the 2017 Rugby League World Cup qualifying.

Fixtures

Notes
  Match moved to neutral territory due to travel restrictions following the 2014–15 Russian military intervention in Ukraine

See also

References

External links

2014 in rugby league
2015 in rugby league